Swim Team is the sixth studio album by American reggae rock band Dirty Heads. Released on October 13, 2017, the album was published by Five Seven Music. The ensemble completed their tour for the album with Tyrone's Jacket and The Unlikely Candidates. The special edition of the album was released on October 19, 2018 to include a single "Visions".

In early 2021, the song "Vacation" started to go viral on TikTok, appearing on many videos. Also, the song "Celebrate" was used during a video montage commemorating All Elite Wrestling's time taping Dynamite at Daley's Place in Jacksonville, Florida during the COVID-19 pandemic at the end of the June 30, 2021 episode.

Track listing

Charts

Album

Singles

References

2017 albums
Dirty Heads albums
Five Seven Music albums